Roundhay is an electoral ward of Leeds City Council in north east Leeds, West Yorkshire, covering the suburb of the same name, Gledhow and Oakwood.

The ward's boundaries run the A6120 Leeds Outer Ring Road to the north and the A58 Wetherby Road to the south and east.  The boundary also follows Gledhow Valley Road to the west before heading north-east to the A6120.

Councillors since 1980 

 indicates seat up for re-election.
 indicates seat up for election following resignation or death of sitting councillor.
 indicates councillor vacancy.
* indicates incumbent councillor.

Elections since 2010

May 2022

May 2021

May 2019

May 2018

May 2016

May 2015

May 2014

May 2012

May 2011

May 2010

See also
Listed buildings in Leeds (Roundhay Ward)

Notes

References

Wards of Leeds